"Tricycle" is a single by British Electronica duo Psapp. It was the first single taken from The Only Thing I Ever Wanted in Europe. In the US, however, it was the second single, with "Hi" being the first.

Following the use of Psapp's "Cosy In The Rocket" in the soundtrack of hit TV show Grey's Anatomy, the single reached the Top 20 in the United Kingdom and France, and peaked inside the Top 40 in Austria, Germany and Australia. In the United States, the single reached #49.

Track listing

Alternate version

Personnel

Carim Clasmann
Galia Durant

Notes

"Wet Box" features spoken word vocals performed by Durant's father.
"Everybody Wants To Be a Cat" is a cover of a song from Disney's The Aristocats.

External links
Psapp jumble shop (official)
Psapp official website 
Tricycle at Domino Records
Psapp at Domino Records

2006 singles
Psapp songs
2006 songs
Domino Recording Company singles